Fatou Bintou Fall (born 23 August 1981 in Tivaonane) is a female track and field athlete from Senegal, who mainly competes in the 400 metres. She set her personal best at the 2004 African Championships, claiming the gold medal: 50.62 seconds.

Competition record

External links

1981 births
Living people
Senegalese female sprinters
Athletes (track and field) at the 2004 Summer Olympics
Olympic athletes of Senegal
World Athletics Championships athletes for Senegal
African Games gold medalists for Senegal
African Games medalists in athletics (track and field)
Universiade medalists in athletics (track and field)
Athletes (track and field) at the 2003 All-Africa Games
Athletes (track and field) at the 2007 All-Africa Games
Universiade medalists for Senegal
Medalists at the 2005 Summer Universiade
Medalists at the 2009 Summer Universiade
Olympic female sprinters